Kachchh Lok Sabha constituency (formerly Kutch Lok Sabha constituency) is one of the 26 Lok Sabha (parliamentary) constituencies in Gujarat state in western India. Kachchh is the third largest constituency in India, with an area of 45,652 km2. It is larger than Denmark.

Vidhan Sabha segments
Presently, Kachchh Lok Sabha constituency comprises seven assembly segments. These are:

Members of Lok Sabha

Election Results

2019 Indian general election in Gujarat

General Election 2014

General Elections 2009

General Elections 2004

See also
 Kachchh District
 Ladakh Lok Sabha constituency and Barmer Lok Sabha constituency, largest by area. 
 List of Constituencies of the Lok Sabha

Notes

Lok Sabha constituencies in Gujarat
Politics of Kutch district